The following events occurred in March 1954:

March 1, 1954 (Monday)
U.S. officials announce that a hydrogen bomb Nuclear Test (Castle Bravo) as part of Operation Castle has been conducted on Bikini Atoll in the Pacific Ocean.
U.S. Capitol shooting: Four Puerto Rican nationalists open fire in the United States House of Representatives chamber and wound five; they are apprehended by security guards.
Born:
Catherine Bach, American actress
Ron Howard, American film director, producer and actor

March 2, 1954 (Tuesday)

 Born: Hunt Sales, musician

March 3, 1954 (Wednesday)

Born:
Keith Fergus, American professional golfer
Robert Gossett, American actor
John Lilley, American musician

March 4, 1954 (Thursday)
Born:
François Fillon, Prime Minister of France (2007-2012)
Ricky Ford, American jazz musician
Peter Jacobsen, American professional golfer
Boris Moiseev, Russian singer
Ray Troll, American artist
Anne Van Lancker, Belgian politician

March 5, 1954 (Friday)

March 6, 1954 (Saturday)

March 7, 1954 (Sunday)
Born:
Mike Armstrong (baseball), American baseball player
Will Grant, American football player
Nyls Nyman, American baseball player
Carol M. Swain, American political scientist
Jasmina Tešanović, Serbian author and political activist
Died:
Otto Diels, German chemist, Nobel Prize laureate (b. 1876)
Will H. Hays, Namesake for the Hays Code (b. 1879)

March 8, 1954 (Monday)
Born:
Cheryl Baker, British singer and television presenter
Karl Schnabl, Austrian Olympic ski jumper
David Wilkie, Scottish Olympic swimmer
Died:
Lawrence Townsend, American diplomat (b. 1860)

March 9, 1954 (Tuesday)
American journalists Edward R. Murrow and Fred W. Friendly produce a 30-minute See It Now documentary, entitled "A Report on Senator Joseph McCarthy".
Born:
Bobby Sands, Irish republican hunger striker (d. 1981)
Died:
Vagn Walfrid Ekman, Swedish oceanographer (b. 1874)
Eva Ahnert-Rohlfs, German astronomer (b. 1912)

March 10, 1954 (Wednesday)

March 11, 1954 (Thursday)

March 12, 1954 (Friday)
Finland and Germany officially end their state of war.

March 13, 1954 (Saturday)
First Indochina War: The Battle of Dien Bien Phu begins, involving the French Union's French Far East Expeditionary Corps and Việt Minh Communist fighters.
Died: César Klein, 77, German Expressionist painter

March 14, 1954 (Sunday)

March 15, 1954 (Monday)

March 16, 1954 (Tuesday)

March 17, 1954 (Wednesday)

March 18, 1954 (Thursday)

March 19, 1954 (Friday)
Joey Giardello knocks out Willie Tory at Madison Square Garden, in the first televised boxing prize fight to be shown in color.

March 20, 1954 (Saturday)

March 21, 1954 (Sunday)

March 22, 1954 (Monday)

March 23, 1954 (Tuesday)
In Vietnam, the Viet Minh capture the main airstrip of Dien Bien Phu. The remaining French Army units there are partially isolated.

March 24, 1954 (Wednesday)

March 25, 1954 (Thursday)
The 26th Academy Awards ceremony is held.
RCA manufactures the first color television set (12-inch screen; price: $1,000)
The Soviet Union recognises the sovereignty of East Germany. Soviet troops remain in the country.

March 26, 1954 (Friday)
Born: Kazuhiko Inoue, Japanese voice actor.
Died: Louis Silvers, American film composer (b. 1889)

March 27, 1954 (Saturday)
The Castle Romeo nuclear test explosion is executed.

March 28, 1954 (Sunday)
Puerto Rico's first television station, WKAQ-TV, commences broadcasting.
Trial of A. L. Zissu and 12 other Zionist leaders ends with harsh sentences in Communist Romania.
The British troopship HMT Empire Windrush suffers an engine-room explosion and fire. Four crew are killed but 1494 crew and passengers are saved. The abandoned ship sinks two days later.
Born:
Bill Bourne, Canadian musician
Arthur Frederick Goode III, American murderer (d. 1984)

March 29, 1954 (Monday)
A C-47 transport with French nurse Geneviève de Galard on board is wrecked on the runway at Dien Bien Phu.
Born: Karen Ann Quinlan, American right-to-die cause célèbre (d. 1985)

March 30, 1954 (Tuesday)
Toronto subway: the first operational subway line in Canada.
Died: Horatio Dresser, American writer (b. 1866)

March 31, 1954 (Wednesday)

Born: Tony Brock, British musician

References

1954
1954-03
1954-03